Yiu Si-wing BBS (born 1955) is a director at China Travel Service and a former member of Legislative Council of Hong Kong.

Background
Yiu began his career in China Travel Service in 1973. In 2011, he joined the Election Committee for Tourism constituency. Yiu was elected as a member of Legislative Council of Hong Kong in 2012 and continued to hold this office in March 2021.

He is a known supporter of former Chief Executive Leung Chun-ying.

Calling for arrest of illegal tour guides
In November 2018, shortly after the opening of the Hong Kong–Zhuhai–Macau Bridge, a large number of tourists from mainland China stayed in Tung Chung district, leading to complaints of local residents about overcrowding. Yiu said that he had asked the Security Bureau to instruct the police to arrest illegal mainland tour guides who had not worked with the legally required Hong Kong liaison.

References

External links

1955 births
Living people
HK LegCo Members 2012–2016
HK LegCo Members 2016–2021
Recipients of the Bronze Bauhinia Star